Moemedi "Jomo" Moatlhaping (born 14 July 1985) is a Botswanan footballer. He currently plays for Gaborone United and Botswana.

References

External links

1985 births
Living people
People from Moshupa
Botswana footballers
Botswana expatriate footballers
Mochudi Centre Chiefs SC players
Botswana international footballers
Township Rollers F.C. players
Platinum Stars F.C. players
Expatriate soccer players in South Africa
Botswana expatriate sportspeople in South Africa
Association football midfielders
2012 Africa Cup of Nations players
Bay United F.C. players